Cameron Litvack (born 23 September 1980) is an American television producer and screenwriter.

Career 
Litvack was born in Los Angeles, California. As a producer, he has worked on sixteen episodes of V (2009), sixteen episodes of Ugly Betty's first season and two episodes of Charmed's eighth season. As a writer, he has worked on ten episodes of Charmed', three episodes of V (2009), two episodes of Ugly Betty's first season and a single episode of Smallville's first season.

The demon character "Litvack" that appeared on the sixteenth episode of the second season of Charmed was named after his father, a WB executive at the time.

The character "Dr. Litvack," a neurosurgeon that appeared in the "Lexmas" episode of Smallville was named after his brother Zachary Litvack, an actual neurosurgeon.

Personal life 
He is the son of television executive and producer John Litvack, known as the "dean of current programming".

References

External links

American television writers
American male television writers
American television producers
Writers Guild of America Award winners
Living people
1980 births